Babiči is a village in the City Municipality of Koper in the Littoral region of Slovenia.

A small church on a hill above the settlement is dedicated to Saints John and Paul. It was abandoned after it was looted by German soldiers that took refuge in the church in the Second World War and it was never restored.

References

External links
Babiči on Geopedia

Populated places in the City Municipality of Koper